Sigurd Wathne (12 February 1898 – 26 March 1942) was a Norwegian football goalkeeper, playing for the club SK Brann. He was born in Copenhagen. He was on the Norway national team at the Antwerp Olympics in 1920; they reached the quarter finals. He was capped 14 times for Norway.

A seaman in the Norwegian Merchant Navy during World War II he sailed with SS Risøy, which was bombed by German aircraft on 20 March 1942, and he died in a hospital in Swansea six days later. He was buried at Danygraig Cemetery, Swansea.

References

External links

1898 births
1942 deaths
Footballers from Copenhagen
Norwegian footballers
Norway international footballers
Footballers at the 1920 Summer Olympics
Olympic footballers of Norway
Nortraship people
Norwegian civilians killed in World War II
Deaths by airstrike during World War II
Association football goalkeepers